Sky One (written as Sky 1 until 31 March 2020) is an entertainment channel operated and owned by Sky Deutschland. The channel launched on 3 November 2016.

History
A sister channel to UK-based Sky One, the channel broadcasts originally produced shows and series and international series. It is available via cable, satellite and IPTV in HD to all Sky Deutschland subscribers as part of the Sky Starter basic package.

The timeshift service Sky 1 +1 started on 22 September 2017 and replaced the timeshift channel Sky Atlantic +1.

In November 2018, Sky 1 +1 was closed.

Programming
Most of the channel's programming is available on Sky On Demand, Sky Go and the Sky Ticket OTT service.

Original programming
Babylon Berlin (2017–present)
Das Boot (2018–present)

Entertainment 

Dogs Might Fly (2016–present)
Eine Liga für sich - Buschis Sechserkette, German version of A League of Their Own (2017–present)
MasterChef USA (2016–present)
MasterChef (German version of the format) (2016–present)
Mitfahr-Randale - Wer aussteigt, verliert (2016–present)
Xaviers Wunschkonzert Live (2017–present)

Series 

100 Code (2017)
9-1-1 (2018–present)
9-1-1: Lone Star
Ballers (2016–present)
Bordertown (2017)
Desperate Housewives (2016–present)
Doc Martin (2016–present)
Doctor Doctor (The Heart Guy) (2017–present)
Edel & Starck (2017–present)
Elementary (2016–present)
Grey's Anatomy (Grey's Anatomy - Die jungen Ärzte) (2017–present)
Hooten & the Lady (2016–present)
La Brea
Madam Secretary (2016–present)
Magnum PI
Madoff (Madoff - Der 50-Milliarden Dollar Betrug) (2016–present)
Medici: Masters of Florence (2016–present)
Morgen hör ich auf (2017–present)
Patrick Melrose (2018–present)
Riviera (2017–present)
The Equalizer
The Endgame
The Rookie
S.W.A.T. (2018–present)
Shooter (2016–present)
Supernatural (2016–present)
Transplant
The Good Doctor (2018–present)
The Tunnel (2016–present)
Victoria  (2016–present)
Wentworth (2016–present)
You, Me and the Apocalypse (2017–present)

References

External links
 

Sky Deutschland
Sky television channels
German-language television stations
Television channels and stations established in 2016
Television stations in Germany
Television stations in Austria
Mass media in Munich